Vlatko Bogdanovski (born 31 December 1964, Yugoslavia) was the FIDE Trainer and chess grandmaster from North Macedonia. He got international master title in 1988 and chess grandmaster title in 1993.

Notable Tournaments

References 

1964 births
Living people
Macedonian chess players
Chess grandmasters
People from Macedonia (region)